Mitato (archaic form: , from , "to measure off/to pitch camp") is a term meaning "shelter" or "lodging" in Greek.

Appearing in the 6th century, during the Byzantine period it referred to an inn or trading house for foreign merchants, akin to a caravanserai. By extension, it could also refer to the legal obligation of a private citizen to billet state officials or soldiers. Alternatively, in the 10th century, Constantine Porphyrogenitus uses the term to refer to state-run ranches in Anatolia.

In modern Greece, and especially on the mountains of Crete, a mitato (in the plural mitata) is a hut built from locally gathered stones to provide shelter to shepherds, and is used also for cheese-making. Mount Ida (also called Mount Psiloritis) in central Crete is particularly rich in flat stones suitable for dry stone construction.

See also
 Vernacular architecture

References

External links 
  Cabanes d'estive (mitata) des environs d'Anogia en Crète centrale (Grèce) (Summer shepherding huts (mitata) in the vicinity of Anogia in central Crete, Greece)

Byzantine secular architecture
Byzantine law
Crete
Mountain huts
Vernacular architecture
Pastoral shelters